Dichotomie is a two-movement composition for solo piano by the Finnish composer Esa-Pekka Salonen.  The work was completed in October 2000 and was first performed by pianist Gloria Cheng on December 4, 2000 in Los Angeles.

Composition
Salonen described the background and composition of Dichotomie in the score program notes, writing:
He continued:

Structure
The work has a duration of roughly 18 minutes and is composed in two movements:
Mécanisme
Organisme

Reception
Daniel Cariaga of the Los Angeles Times praised Dichotomie, remarking, "The first [movement] is wide-ranging but standoffish, the second many hued and emotionally resonant. Both parts are complex, dense with activity, thick with chordal movement yet unchaotic, very often Lisztian in textures."  Reviewing a later recording of the piece, Anthony Tommasini of The New York Times similarly noted the "stupefying challenges" of the piano writing.  Arnold Whittall of Gramophone wrote, "Dichotomie (2000) for solo piano provides a useful digest of Salonen’s current compositional preoccupations. Its first movement deploys aggressive but constantly shifting rhythmic mechanisms whose origins lie in Prokofiev, while its second seems closer to the flowing spontaneity of the Ligeti Etudes."

References

Compositions by Esa-Pekka Salonen
2000 compositions
Compositions for solo piano